Franklin Pierce High School is a public high school in Clover Creek, Washington (the facility has a Tacoma mailing address). It is named after the fourteenth US President, Franklin Pierce, who was president when the Washington Territory was formed in 1853. It is a part of the Franklin Pierce School District.

Boundary
Communities in the attendance boundary of the school include much of Clover Creek, Midland, and Summit as well as portions of Parkland, Summit View, and Waller. It also includes one block of Tacoma.

Demographics
The demographic breakdown of the 1,202 students enrolled in 2018–2019 was:
 Male 51.7%
 Female 48.3%
 Native American/Alaskan 0.4%
 Asian 9.0%
 Native Hawaiian/Pacific islanders 3.8%
 Black 9.1%
 Hispanic 25.2%
 White 41.7%
 Multiracial 10.8%

69.2% of the students were eligible for free or reduced-cost lunch.

Sports
Franklin Pierce competes in the South Puget Sound League. It is classified as a 2A school.

Notable alumni

 Pat Austin, drag racer 
 Amber Lancaster, actress
 Sean Osborn, Clarinetist and Composer
 Miesha Tate, UFC Fighter

References

External links
 
 Franklin Pierce School District

High schools in Pierce County, Washington
South Puget Sound League
Educational institutions established in 1952
Public high schools in Washington (state)
1952 establishments in Washington (state)